Leigh Arnold (born Megan Leigh Arnold) is an Irish actress. A native of Foxrock, County Dublin, Arnold is known for her role of Dr Clodagh Delaney in the Irish TV series The Clinic.

Early life

Arnold was a pupil of St Andrew's College in Dublin and took a degree in psychology and psychoanalysis at LSB College Dublin.

In 2001, she was accepted to the American Academy of Dramatic Arts in New York.

Career

Film and TV
Arnold landed the role of Dr Clodagh Delaney on the Irish TV series The Clinic, a multi award-winning drama for RTÉ. There were seven series from 2003 to 2009, to critical acclaim and she was nominated for Best Supporting Actress at the Irish Film and Television Awards.

In 2010, she appeared on Celebrity Salon on TV3.

Theatre
Arnold's theatre experience in Ireland includes Gerry Stenbridges' he Grown Up's, at the Peacock Theatre, Helen of Troy in Michael Scotts Trojan Women, The Vagina Monologues, My First Time and, in 2010, the role of Mina in Michael Scotts Dracula at the Tivoli Theatre.

Philanthropy
Arnold combines her acting work with charity work and from 2009 to 2011 was an Ambassador for UNICEF Ireland. 
She is also a patron of FirstLight, a charity supporting families experiencing death of young children.

Endorsements
Gosh Cosmetics (2010) Face of Gosh – Lady Gosh

Personal life
Arnold has had two sons with Steve Davies: Hunter, born in 2012, and Flynn, born in 2013. Their wedding was postponed from 2013 to 2014 after Flynn's sudden infant death aged 2 weeks.

In September 2015 she had a daughter, Piper.

Nominations

Irish Film and Television Awards (2007) Nomination – Best Supporting Actress

References

External links
 
 
 RTÉ The Clinic
 Spotlight

Living people
Irish film actresses
Irish stage actresses
Irish television actresses
Participants in Irish reality television series
People educated at St Andrew's College, Dublin
Year of birth missing (living people)